Tranquility is an unincorporated community in Adams County, in the U.S. state of Ohio.

History
Tranquility had its start in the 1830s when a country store opened there. A post office was established at Tranquility in 1848, and remained in operation until 1912.

References

Unincorporated communities in Adams County, Ohio
1830s establishments in Ohio
Unincorporated communities in Ohio